Ross Gregory Ousley (3 March 1937 – 14 May 1993) was an Australian rules footballer who played with Carlton in the Victorian Football League (VFL).

Notes

External links 

Ross Ousley's playing statistics from The VFA Project
Ross Ousley's profile at Blueseum

1937 births
Australian rules footballers from Victoria (Australia)
Carlton Football Club players
Port Melbourne Football Club players
Northcote Football Club players
Golden Square Football Club players

1993 deaths